MPH (Mobile-Pedestrian-Handheld) was a mobile extension of the ATSC television standard jointly developed by Harris Corporation, LG Electronics, Inc. and its U.S. research subsidiary, Zenith Electronics. The MPH platform allowed local TV stations to deliver ATSC-compatible content to mobile and video devices such as mobile phones, portable media players, laptop computers, personal navigation devices and automobile-based "infotainment systems." The service is called "in-band" because local broadcasters are providing mobile TV services as part of their terrestrial transmission within the same, existing 6 MHz channel they use for their ATSC DTV programming.

With the installation of an MPH exciter and signal encoding equipment, existing TV transmission systems would have transmitted a signal which could be received on "MPH-ready" devices. The system allowed the splitting of the 6 MHz, 19.4 Mbit/s of spectrum into a slice for a traditional DTV signal and a slice for MPH use, serving several types of user with a single DTV channel.

The MPH system is a multiple-stream approach, with the main service stream for existing DTV and HDTV services, and the MPH stream for one or more mobile, pedestrian, and/or handheld services. Key attributes of the MPH system were:

 Backward compatibility with existing ATSC 8VSB transmission and receiving equipment
 Capability to receive broadcast signals at high (mobile) speed with a single antenna
 Use of small handheld receivers without the need for multiple antennas
 Power savings in handheld receivers
 Flexibility in both data rates and robustness
 Data-rate efficiency
 Use of advanced video and audio coding

The MPH standard was later combined with competing mobile ATSC proposals, to become ATSC-M/H, which remains the current standard.

References 
 , April 3, 2007.

 Harris Corporation MTV brochure

ATSC
Quantized radio modulation modes
Digital television